Neoregostoma bettelai is a species of beetle in the family Cerambycidae.

References

Rhinotragini
Beetles described in 2010